Post Toasties was an early American breakfast cereal made by Post Foods. It was named for its originator, C. W. Post, and intended as the Post version of corn flakes.

Post Toasties were originally sold as Elijah's Manna (c. 1904) until criticism from religious groups (and consequent loss of sales) led to a change of name in 1908.
 
As of August 2016, Post Toasties are listed as discontinued on the PostFoods web site. This includes flavors Frosted Flakes, O's, and Corn Flakes.

References

Post cereals